The 1872 Kerry by-election was fought on 6 February 1872[20 3].  The byelection was held due to the incumbent Liberal MP Valentine Browne succeeding to the peerage as Earl of Kenmare.  It was won by the Home Rule candidate Rowland Blennerhassett.  The by-election was important in the decline of the Catholic Union whose candidate was defeated by Blennerhassett, who although a Home Ruler was a Protestant.  The Bishop of Kerry had condemned the Home Rule campaign.

Results

References

By-elections to the Parliament of the United Kingdom in County Kerry constituencies
1872 elections in the United Kingdom
1872 elections in Ireland